The 2015 La Flèche Wallonne Féminine was the 18th edition of the La Flèche Wallonne Féminine one-day women's road bicycle race held in Belgium, starting and ending in the town of Huy. The race included two climbs of the Mur de Huy; the finish line was at the top of the second of these ascents.

The race was won by Anna van der Breggen. Van der Breggen attacked at the bottom of the Mur and took a solo victory, 12 seconds ahead of Annemiek van Vleuten, with Megan Guarnier a further 8 seconds back in third. Van der Breggen moved into the lead of the 2015 UCI Women's Road World Cup following the race.

Results

Race results

World Cup standings

References

External links 

 

La Fleche Wallonne Feminine
La Flèche Wallonne Feminine
La Fleche Wallonne Feminine